The following outline is provided as an overview of and topical guide to Punjab:

Punjab –  state in North India, forming part of the larger Punjab region. The state is bordered by the Indian states of Jammu and Kashmir to the north, Himachal Pradesh to the east, Haryana to the south and southeast, Rajasthan to the southwest, and the Pakistani province of Punjab to the west. The state capital is located in Chandigarh, a Union Territory and also the capital of the neighbouring state of Haryana. After the partition of India in 1947, the Punjab province of British India was divided between India and Pakistan. The Indian Punjab was divided in 1966 with the formation of the new states of Haryana and Himachal Pradesh alongside the current state of Punjab. Punjab is the only Sikh majority state in India.

General reference

Names 
 Common English name: Punjab
 Pronunciation: 
 Official English name(s): Punjab
 Nickname(s): 
 Adjectival(s): Punjabi
 Demonym(s): Punjabis

Rankings (amongst India's states) 

 by population: 16th
 by area (2011 census): 20th
 by crime rate (2015): 24th
 by gross domestic product (GDP) (2014): 14th
by Human Development Index (HDI): 
by life expectancy at birth: 
by literacy rate:

Geography of Punjab, India 

Geography of Punjab, India
 Punjab is: an Indian state
 Population of Punjab, India: 
 Area of Punjab, India:  
 Atlas of Punjab

Location of Punjab, India 
 Punjab is situated within the following regions:
 Northern Hemisphere
 Eastern Hemisphere
 Eurasia
 Asia
 South Asia
 India
 North India
 Punjab region
 Time zone:  Indian Standard Time (UTC+05:30)

Environment of Punjab, India

Natural geographic features of Punjab, India 

 Lakes in Punjab, India
 Harike Wetland
 Kanjli Wetland 
 Ropar Wetland

Regions of Punjab, India 

Regions of Punjab, India
 Majha
 Malwa
 Doaba
 Powadh

Ecoregions of Punjab, India

Administrative divisions of Punjab, India

Districts of Punjab, India 

Districts of Punjab, India
 Amritsar district
 Barnala district
 Bathinda district
 Faridkot district
 Fatehgarh Sahib district
 Fazilka district
 Firozpur district
 Gurdaspur district
 Hoshiarpur district
 Jalandhar district
 Kapurthala district
 Ludhiana district
 Mansa district
 Moga district
 Mohali district
 Pathankot district
 Patiala district
 Rupnagar district
 Sangrur district
 Shahid Bhagat Singh Nagar district
 Sri Muktsar Sahib district
 Tarn Taran district

Municipalities of Punjab, India 

 Capital of Punjab: Chandigarh – Union Territory, and not part of Punjab. It also serves as the capital of Haryana.
 Cities of Punjab, India
 Ludhiana
 Amritsar
 Jalandhar
 Patiala
 Bathinda
 Hoshiarpur
 Mohali
 Batala
 Pathankot
 Moga

Demography of Punjab, India 

Demographics of Punjab, India

Government and politics of Punjab, India 

Politics of Punjab

 Form of government: Indian state government (parliamentary system of representative democracy)
 Capital of Punjab: Capital of Punjab
 Elections in Punjab, India
 Political issues in Punjab, India
 Punjabi nationalism

Union government in Punjab, India 
 Rajya Sabha members from Punjab
 Punjab Pradesh Congress Committee
 Indian general election, 2009 (Punjab)
 Indian general election, 2014 (Punjab)

Branches of the government of Punjab, India 

Government of Punjab, India

Executive branch of the government of Punjab, India 

 Head of state: Governor of Punjab, India, 
 Head of government: Chief Minister of Punjab, India, 
 Council of Ministers of Punjab, India

Legislative branch of the government of Punjab, India 

Punjab Legislative Assembly
 Constituencies of Punjab Legislative Assembly

Judicial branch of the government of Punjab, India 

 Punjab and Haryana High Court
 Chief Justice of Punjab, India

Law and order in Punjab, India 

 Human rights in Punjab, India
 Law enforcement in Punjab, India
 Punjab Police (India)

History of Punjab, India 

History of Punjab, India
 History of the Punjab

History of Punjab, by period

Prehistoric Punjab, India

Ancient Punjab, India 

 King Porus

Medieval Punjab, India 

 Pre-Ghaznavid history of Punjab

Colonial Punjab, India

Contemporary Punjab, India

History of Punjab, by region

History of Punjab, by subject

Culture of Punjab, India 

Culture of Punjab, India
 Aawat pauni
 Architecture of Punjab, India
 Calendars in Punjab, India
 Punjabi calendar
 Nanakshahi calendar
 Bikrami calendar
 Monuments in Punjab
 Monuments of National Importance in Punjab, India
 State Protected Monuments in Punjab, India
 Punjabi wedding traditions
 World Heritage Sites in Punjab

Art in Punjab, India 
 Art in Punjab, India
 Cinema of Punjab, India
 Punjabi cinema
 Indian Punjabi films
 Punjabi-language films
 Dance of Punjab, India
 Folk dances of Punjab
  Bhangra
 Literature of Punjab, India
 Punjabi literature
 Punjabi authors
 Punjabi folklore
 Punjabi Wikipedia
 Music of Punjab
 Bhangra
 Folk music
 Punjabi singers
 Television in Punjab, India
 Punjabi-language television channels
 Theatre in Punjab, India

Cuisine of Punjab, India 

 Cuisine of Punjab, India
 Punjabi cuisine
 Punjabi bhathi
 Punjabi dhaba – roadside restaurant or cafe featuring Punjabi cuisine
 Punjabi tandoor
 Sattu

Dress in Punjab, India 

 Punjabi clothing
 Jutti
 Patiala salwar
 Phulkari
 Punjabi ghagra
 Punjabi Tamba and Kurta
 Salwar (Punjabi) Suit

Fairs and festivals in Punjab, India 

Fairs and festivals in Punjab, India
 Punjabi festivals
 Lohri
 Basant Kite Festival (Punjab)
 Maghi
 Holi, Punjab
 Teeyan
 Rakhri
 Vaisakhi
 Religious festivals
 Hindu Punjabi Festivals
 Hindu festivals in the Punjab
 Sikh festivals

Languages in Punjab, India 

 Punjabi language
 Alphabets used to write Punjabi
Shahmukhi alphabet (used mostly by Muslims)
Gurmukhī alphabet (used mostly by Sikhs and Hindus)
 Punjabi dialects
 Eastern Punjabi
 Punjabi grammar
 History of the Punjabi language

People of Punjab, India 

 Punjabis
 Punjabi diaspora
 Punjabi Hindus
 Punjabi Muslims
 Rajputs
 Punjabi tribes
 People from Punjab, India

Religion in Punjab, India 

Religion in Punjab, India
 Buddhism in Punjab, India
 Christianity in Punjab, India
 Hinduism in Punjab, India
 Islam in Punjab, India
 Punjabi folk religion
 Sanjhi
 Gugga
 Chhapar Mela
 Sakhi Sarwar Saint
 Punjabi fasts
 Sikhism in Punjab, India

Sports in Punjab, India 

Sports in Punjab, India
 Cricket in Punjab, India
 Punjab Cricket Association
 Punjab cricket team (India)
 Football in Punjab, India
 Punjab Football Association
 Punjab football team
 Kila Raipur Sports Festival
 Punjabi Kabaddi

Symbols of Punjab, India 

Symbols of Punjab, India
 State animal:
 State bird:
 State flower:
 State seal: Seal of Punjab, India
 State tree:

Economy and infrastructure of Punjab, India 

Economy of Punjab, India
 Agriculture in Punjab, India
 Banking in Punjab, India
 Communications in Punjab, India
 Internet in Punjab, India
 Punjabi-language newspapers
 Companies of Punjab, India
 Currency of Punjab: 
 Economic history of Punjab, India
 Health care in Punjab, India
 Mining in Punjab, India
 Punjab Stock Exchange
 Tourism in Punjab, India
 Water supply and sanitation in Punjab, India
 Canals in Punjab, India
 Sutlej Yamuna link canal 
 Indira Gandhi Canal
 Buddha Nullah Sirhind Canal

Energy in Punjab, India 

 Hydro-electric power stations in Punjab, India
 Bhakra Hydro-electric power station
 Shanan Hydro-electric power station
 Shang Hydro-electric power station
 Thermal power stations in Punjab, India
 Bhatinda thermal power station 
 Rover thermal power station
 Dehar thermal power station
 Gurunanak thermal project

Transport in Punjab, India 

Transport in Punjab, India
 Airports in Punjab, India
 Rail transport in Punjab, India
 Railways in Punjab, India
 Rail Coach Factory, Kapurthala
 Patiala Locomotive Works, Patiala
 Vehicular transport in Punjab, India
 State highways in Punjab, India
 Bridges in Punjab, India
 Ravi bridge (Pathankot & Jammu): Length:2,800 feet.
 Alegjandria bridge (Chenab): Length:9,088 feet.
 Sutlej bridge : Length:4,210 feet.

Education in Punjab, India 

Education in Punjab, India
 Punjab School Education Board
 Institutions of higher education in Punjab, India
 Punjabi University

Health in Punjab, India 

Health in Punjab, India
COVID-19 pandemic in Punjab, India

See also 

 Outline of India

References

External links 

Punjab
Punjab
 1